The following is a list of the persons who have served in the Vermont House of Representatives during the 2005-2006 session:

Members Listed by District

Addison-1
Steven B. Maier,  Democrat
Betty A. Nuovo,  Democrat

Addison-2
Willem W. Jewett,  Democrat

Addison-3
Gregory S. Clark,    Republican
Constance T. Houston,   Republican RETIRING

Addison-4
Michael Fisher,    Democrat
David Sharpe,   Democrat

Addison-5 
Harvey T. Smith,   Republican

Addison-Rutland-1 
Mark S. Young,   RepublicanRETIRING

Bennington-1 
Bill Botzow,  Democrat

Bennington-2-1 
Timothy R. Corcoran, II,   Democrat
Joseph L. Krawczyk, Jr.,   Republican

Bennington-2-2 
Anne H. Mook,   Democrat
Mary A. Morrissey,   Republican

Bennington-3 
Alice Miller,  Democrat

Bennington-4 
Judith Livingston,   Republican

Bennington-5 
Lawrence E. Molloy,   DemocratRETIRING

Bennington-Rutland-1 
Patti Komline,  Republican

Caledonia-1 
Leigh Larocque, Republican

Caledonia-2 
Lucy Leriche,   Democrat

Caledonia-3 
Donald E. Bostic,   Republican
David T. Clark,   Republican

Caledonia-4 
Cola H. Hudson,   Republican
Richard Lawrence,    Republican

Caledonia-Washington-1 
Steve Larrabee,   Republican

Chittenden-1-1 
William J. Lippert,    Democrat

Chittenden-1-2 
Scott A. Orr,   Democrat

Chittenden-2 
Jim McCullough,   Democrat
Mary N. Peterson,  Democrat

Chittenden-3-1 	
William N. Aswad,  Democrat
Kurt Wright,  Republican

Chittenden-3-2 
Mark Larson,  Democrat

Chittenden-3-3 
Jason P. Lorber,  Democrat
John Patrick Tracy,   Democrat

Chittenden-3-4 
Bob Kiss, Progressive (Stepped down from House on April 1, 2006 after being elected Mayor of Burlington)
Christopher A Pearson,   Progressive (Appointed by Governor James Douglas to serve out the remainder of the term of Bob Kiss)

David Zuckerman,  Progressive

Chittenden-3-5 
Johannah Leddy Donovan,    Democrat
Bill Keogh,   Democrat

Chittenden-3-6 
Kenneth W. Atkins,   Democrat
George C. Cross,  DemocratRETIRING

Chittenden-3-7 
Michele Kupersmith,   Democrat

Chittenden-3-8 
Ann D. Pugh,  Democrat

Chittenden-3-9 
Albert "Sonny" C. Audette,  Democrat

Chittenden-3-10 
Helen Head,  Democrat

Chittenden-4 
Denise B. Barnard,  Democrat

Chittenden-5-1 
Joyce Errecart,  Republican

Chittenden-5-2 
Stephen B. Dates,   Republican

Chittenden-6-1 
Debbie Evans,  Democrat
Linda K. Myers,   Republican

Chittenden-6-2 
Peter D. Hunt,  Democrat
Tim Jerman,   Democrat

Chittenden-6-3 
Martha P. Heath,  Democrat

Chittenden-7-1 
Jim Condon,  Democrat
Malcolm F. Severance,  RepublicanRETIRING

Chittenden-7-2 
Patrick M. Brennan,  Republican
Kathrine R. Niquette,  Republican

Chittenden-8 
William R. Frank,  Democrat
Gaye R. Symington,  Democrat  (House Speaker)

Chittenden-9 
Kevin J. Endres,  RepublicanRETIRING
Donald H. Turner,   Republican

Essex-Caledonia 
Janice L. Peaslee,  Republican

Essex-Caledonia-Orleans 
William F. Johnson,  Republican

Franklin-1 
Carolyn Whitney Branagan,   Republican
Brian C. Dunsmore,    Republican

Franklin-2 
George R. Allard,  Democrat
Richard J. Howrigan,   Democrat

Franklin-3 
Kathleen C. Keenan,   Democrat
Alan Parent,   RepublicanRUNNING FOR STATE SENATE-FRANKLIN DISTRICT

Franklin-4 
Avis L. Gervais,   Democrat

Franklin-5 
Kathy LaBelle LaVoie,   Republican
John S. Winters,   RepublicanRETIRING

Franklin-6 
Norman H. McAllister,   Republican
Albert J. Perry,   Democrat

Grand Isle-Chittenden-1-1 
Mitzi Johnson,   Democrat
Ira Trombley,   Democrat

Lamoille-1 
Richard C. Marron,  RepublicanRETIRING

Lamoille-2 
Linda J. Martin,   Democrat

Lamoille-3 
Floyd W. Nease,   Democrat

Lamoille-4 
Richard A. Westman,   Republican

Lamoille-Washington-1 
Warren Miller,   RepublicanRETIRING
Shap Smith,   Democrat

Orange-1 
Sylvia R. Kennedy,   Republican
Philip C. Winters,   Republican

Orange-2 
Sarah Copeland-Hanzas,   Democrat

Orange-Addison-1 
Patsy French,   Democrat
Jim Hutchinson,   Democrat

Orange-Caledonia-1 
Harvey B. Otterman,  Republican

Orleans-1 
Winston E. Dowland,   Progressive
Loren T. Shaw,   Republican

Orleans-2 
Duncan F. Kilmartin,    Republican
Michael J. Marcotte,   Republican

Orleans-Caledonia-1 
John Morley,   Republican
John S. Rodgers,   Democrat

Orleans-Franklin-1 
Dexter Randall,   Progressive

Rutland-1-1 
Andrew P. Donaghy,   Republican

Rutland-1-2 
Joseph Baker,  Republican
Dave Potter,   Democrat

Rutland-2 
William Canfield,    Republican
Robert Helm,   Republican

Rutland-3 
Gail Fallar,   Democrat

Rutland-4 
David A. Sunderland,   Republican

Rutland-5-1 
Christopher C. Louras,   RepublicanRETIRING

Rutland-5-2 
Thomas S. DePoy,   Republican

Rutland-5-3 
Steven J. Howard,   Democrat

Rutland-5-4 
David W. Allaire,   Republican

Rutland-6 
Margaret Flory,    Republican

Rutland-7 
Joe Acinapura,   Republican

Rutland-8 
John W. Malcolm,  Democrat

Rutland-Windsor-1 
Harry L. Chen,  Democrat

Washington-1 
Carol Hosford,   Democrat

Washington-2 
Anne B. Donahue,   Republican
Maxine Jo Grad,   Democrat

Washington-3-1 
Leo M. Valliere,   Republican

Washington-3-2 
Harry S. Monti,   Democrat

Washington-3-3 
Stephen Green,   DemocratRETIRING

Washington-4 
Thomas F. Koch,   Republican
Francis M. McFaun,   Republican

Washington-5 
Francis K. Brooks,   Democrat

Washington-6 
Janet Ancel,   Democrat

Washington-7 
Tony Klein,   Democrat

Washington-Chittenden-1 
Robert Dostis,   Democrat
Sue Minter,   Democrat

Windham-1 
Patty O'Donnell,    Republican

Windham-2 
Robert Rusten,   DemocratRETIRING

Windham-3-1 
Virginia A. Milkey,   Democrat

Windham-3-2 
Daryl L. Pillsbury,   Independent

Windham-3-3 
Sarah R. Edwards,   Progressive

Windham-4 
Michael J. Obuchowski,  Democrat
Carolyn W. Partridge,   Democrat

Windham-5 
Steve Darrow,   Democrat
David L. Deen,   Democrat

Windham-6 
Richard J. Marek,  Democrat

Windham-Bennington-1 
Philip E. Bartlett,   Republican

Windham-Bennington-Windsor-1 
Richard W. Hube,   Republican

Windsor-1-1 
Kathy Pellett,   Democrat

Windsor-1-2 
Alice M. Emmons,   Democrat
Clint Martin,    Democrat

Windsor-2 
Ernest Shand,   Democrat

Windsor-3 
Donna G. Sweaney,   Democrat

Windsor-4 
Steven C. Adams,   Republican

Windsor-5 
Alison H. Clarkson,   Democrat

Windsor-6-1 
Michael S. Reese,   DemocratRETIRING

Windsor-6-2 
Lynn L. Bohi,   DemocratRETIRING
Michael R. Kainen,   Republican

Windsor-Orange-1 
Rosemary McLaughlin,   Democrat

Windsor-Orange-2 
Jim Masland,   Democrat
Ann Seibert,   DemocratRETIRING

Windsor-Rutland-1 
Alice W. Nitka,   DemocratRUNNING FOR STATE SENATE-WINDSOR DISTRICT

Windsor-Rutland-2 
Sandy Haas,   Progressive

See also
Members of the Vermont Senate, 2005-2006 session
Vermont Representative Districts, 2002-2012

External links
Vermont Representative Biographies